Aatmiyudu is a 1977 Telugu-language drama film, produced by Vadde Sobhanadri under the Vijaya Madhavi Pictures banner and directed by T. Rama Rao. It stars Akkineni Nageswara Rao, Jayachitra  and music composed by J. V. Raghavulu.

Plot
Ranga (Akkineni Nageswara Rao) an orphan, is raised by a millionaire Dharma Rao (Satyanarayana), they share a bond beyond a causal relation, one of the father and son. Ranga loves and marries a beautiful girl Mahalakshmi (Jayachitra). Here Narasimham (Rao Gopal Rao) and Giri (Mohan Babu), vicious people are Dharma Rao's relatives and they try to grab the property. But Ranga shields his property at every level. Meanwhile, Dharma Rao's son Vijay (Murali Mohan) returns from abroad along with his family when Dharma Rao entrusts the business responsibilities to him. Here, Vijay could not bear the dominance and authoritative behavior of Ranga. Moreover, he goes into the clutches of Narasimham and Giri. Once Vijay humiliates Ranga, which Dharma Rao is unable to tolerate, so, between two fires he throws him out. But the separation of Ranga makes him depressed. Exploiting the situation, Narasimham and Giri slaughters Vijay and his wife Sarada (Y. Vijaya), indicts Ranga in it and their child who witnessed the crime runs away. Now the court sentences Ranga to life imprisonment. Meanwhile, the barbaric people addict slow poison to Dharma Rao and acquire authority on the property. Ranga learns regarding it, absconds from the prison, arrives in disguise form, safeguards Dharma Rao and his grandson, proves his innocence and stops the baddies. Finally, the movie ends on a happy note with a reunion of the family.

Cast

Akkineni Nageswara Rao as Ranga
Jayachitra as Mahalakshmi 
Rao Gopal Rao as Narasimham
Satyanarayana as Dharma Rao
Allu Ramalingaiah as Lingaiah 
Raja Babu as Chinna Rao 
Mohan Babu as Giri
Murali Mohan as Vijay
Sakshi Ranga Rao as Bhadraiah
P. J. Sarma as Dr. Jaganatham 
Kakaraala as Rajaiah
Jagga Rao
Madhavi as Latha
Chhaya Devi as Durga
Halam as Chitti 
Jayamalini as item number
Y. Vijaya as Sarada

Crew
Art: G. V. Subba Rao
Choreography: Heeralal
Dialogues: Satyanand
Lyrics: Acharya Aatreya, Veturi, Gopi 
Playback: S. P. Balasubrahmanyam, P. Susheela
Music: J. V. Raghavulu 
Editing: G. G. Krishna Rao
Cinematography: P. S. Selvaraj 
Producer: Vadde Sobhanadri
Story - Screenplay - Director: T. Rama Rao 
Banner: Vijaya Madhavi Pictures
Release Date: 1977

Soundtrack

Music composed by J. V. Raghavulu.

References

Indian drama films
Films directed by T. Rama Rao
Films scored by J. V. Raghavulu
1977 drama films
1977 films